Gurukula Kangri (deemed to be university) ('गुरुकुल कांगड़ी समविश्वविद्यालय') is a government-funded deemed to be university u/s 3 of the UGC act 1956 located in Haridwar, Uttarakhand, India. It is fully funded by UGC. It is NAAC "B" grade accredited. Situated near the bank of the Ganges about 6 km from Haridwar and about 200 km from New Delhi. Gurukula Kangri has 25 academic departments covering Engineering, Applied Sciences, Vedic Sciences, Humanities and Social Sciences and Management programs with a strong emphasis on Vedic and Modern Sciences and technological education and research. The university has signed about 34 memorandums of understanding with industries, universities, NGOs, and institutions.

History of GKV 
Gurukula Kangri (Deemed to be University) was founded on 4 March 1902 by the Arya Samaj sannyasi Swami Shraddhanand, who was a follower of Dayananda Saraswati, with the sole aim to revive the ancient Indian gurukula system of education. This institution was established with the objective of providing an indigenous alternative to Lord Macaulay's education policy by imparting education in the areas of Vedic literature, Indian philosophy, Indian culture, modern sciences, and research.

The Arya Samaj which advocated women's education, as part of its policies for the upliftment of women in the country, established the Kanya Gurukula Campus, Dehradun in 1922 by Acharya Ramdevji making it a second campus of women's education. But to give real shape to the dreams of Swami Shraddhanandaji, Kanya Gurukula Campus, Hardwar was established in 1993.

The Gurukula has witnessed many distinguished guests. A few of them being C. F. Andrews, Ramsay MacDonald, Mahatma Gandhi, Pt. Madan Mohan Malaviya, Dr. Rajendra Prasad, Dr Radha Krishnan, Sh. Jamnalal Bajaj, Dr. Munje, Sadhu Vaswani, Pt. Jawahar Lal Nehru, Smt. Indira Gandhi and Sh. Gyani Jail Singh, Sh. L.K. Advani and in 2011 Smt. Meira Kumar the then speaker of the Lok Sabha.

The impetus for the foundation was found in the teachings and activities of Dayananda Saraswati, founder of the Arya Samaj. The first foundation brick was laid down in Gujrawala, Punjab. During India Partition Swami ji searched for a suitable palace in India according to the imagination of Dayananda Saraswati as mentioned in Satyarth Prakash. The site of Kangri village, Bijnor district, was flooded when the river changed course in 1924; the new (Present) campus was built Subsequently.

Campuses 

The university has separate Campuses for Men and Women.
 Main Campus, Gurukula Kangri (Deemed to be University), Haridwar (Boys)
 Kanya Campus, Haridwar (Girls)
 Kanya Gurukul Mahavidhyalaya, Dehradun (Girls)
 Faculty of Engineering and Technology, Haridwar (Boys)

Faculties and Departments 
Faculty of Oriental Studies

 Department of AIHC & Archaeology
 Department of Philosophy
 Department of Shradhanand Vedic Shodh Sansthan
 Department of Sanskrit
 Department of Veda
 Department of Jyotirvigyan and Karmkand

Faculty of Humanities

 Department of Psychology
 Department of Hindi
 Department of English

Faculty of Sciences

 Department of Mathematics & Statistics
 Department of Physics
 Department of Chemistry
 Department of Computer Science

Faculty of Life Sciences

 Department of Zoology and Environmental Science
 Department of Botany & Microbiology

Faculty of Management Studies

 Department of Management Studies

Faculty of Engineering & Technology

 Department of Computer Science & Engineering
 Department of Electronics and Communication Engineering
 Department of Electrical Engineering
 Department of Mechanical Engineering
 Department of Applied Sciences

Faculty of Pharmaceutical Sciences

 Department of Pharmaceutical Sciences

Faculty of Yoga and Physical Education

 Department of Physical Education & Sports
 Department of Yogic Sciences

Faculty of Education

Courses Offered

Notable alumni

 Chetan Anand
 Nawazuddin Siddiqui
 Sudhakar Chaturvedi
 Swami Ramdev
 Dr. Ramveer
 Dr Prashant Katiyar

Achievements
 A+ Grade is provided by National Assessment and Accreditation Council (NAAC) in Dec, 2021.
 Deemed University Status: The distinguished services of this institution to the nation were recognized when it was given the status of Deemed to be University in 1962 by University Grants Commission.
 Four-Star Status: National Accreditation and Assessment Council (NAAC) has awarded four-star status to the Vishwavidyalaya in 2015 valid up to 15 November 2020.
 Centenary Year: Vishwavidyalaya celebrated 2002 as its centenary year.
 Membership: Gurukula Kangri Vishwavidyalaya is a Registered autonomous institute. All the degrees conferred by the vishwavidyalaya are recognized by UGC and AICTE wherever required.
Gurukula Kangri Vishwavidyalaya is a member of the Association of Indian Universities and Association of Commonwealth Universities.

References

Further reading
 Gurukul Kangri Vidyapeeth, Haridwar ka Sau Varsh ka Itihas, by Jayadev Vedalankar. Bhartiya Vidya Prakashan, Delhi, 2002.
 Speech at Gurukul, Hardwar (8 April 1915). Collected Works, by Gandhi. Publications Division, Ministry of Information and Broadcasting, Govt. of India, 1958. v.13. Page 46.

External links 
 Gurukula Kangri (Deemed to be University) Website 
 
Uttarakhand Government Portal

Arya Samaj
Universities and colleges in Uttarakhand
Buildings and structures in Haridwar
Deemed universities in India
Educational institutions established in 1902
Universities and colleges affiliated with the Arya Samaj
 
1902 establishments in India